Greece competed at the 1988 Summer Olympics in Seoul, South Korea.  Greek athletes have competed in every Summer Olympic Games.

Medalists

Competitors
The following is the list of number of competitors in the Games.

Athletics

Women's Javelin Throw
 Anna Verouli
 Qualification – 58.52m (→ did not advance)

Sailing

Men

Open

Swimming

Men's 100m Backstroke
 Helias Malamas
 Heat – 59.24 (→ did not advance, 34th place)

Men's 200m Backstroke
 Charalambos Papanikolaou
 Heat – DSQ (→ did not advance, no ranking)

Men's 100m Breaststroke
 Nikolaos Fokianos
 Heat – 1:06.30 (→ did not advance, 47th place)

Men's 200m Breaststroke
 Nikolaos Fokianos
 Heat – 2:28.91 (→ did not advance, 45th place)

Men's 100m Butterfly
 Theodoras Griniazakis
 Heat – 57.56 (→ did not advance, 36th place)

Men's 200m Individual Medley
 Charalambos Papanikolaou
 Heat – 2:05.53
 B-Final – 2:06.61 (→ 14th place)

Men's 400m Individual Medley
 Charalambos Papanikolaou
 Heat – 4:26.72
 B-Final – 4:27.95 (→ 16th place)

Men's 4 × 100 m Medley Relay
 Helias Malamas, Nikolaos Fokianos, Theodoros Griniazakis, and Charalambos Papanikolaou
 Heat – 4:07.71 (→ did not advance, 23rd place)

Tennis

Women's Singles Competition
Olga Tsarbopoulou
 First Round – Lost to Mercedes Paz (Argentina) 6-7, 3-6

Water polo

Men's Team Competition 
 Preliminary round (group B)
 Lost to Hungary (10-12)
 Defeated China (10-7)
 Lost to Yugoslavia (7-17)
 Lost to United States (9-18)
 Lost to Spain (9-12)
 Classification Round (Group E)
 Defeated South Korea (17-7)
 Defeated France (10-7) → 9th place
 Team roster
 Nikolaos Christoforidis
 Filippos Kaiafas
 Epaminondas Samartzidis
 Anastasios Tsikaris
 Kyriakos Giannopoulos
 Aristidis Kefalogiannis
 Nikolaos Venetopoulos
 Dimitrios Seletopoulos
 Antonios Aronis
 Evangelos Pateros
 George Mavrotas
 Evangelos Patras
Head coach: Losifidis Koulis

References

sports-reference

Nations at the 1988 Summer Olympics
1988
Olympics